Police General Anton Soedjarwo (21 September 1930, in Bandung, West Java – 18 April 1988, in Bandung) was Chief of the Indonesian National Police from 4 December 1982 to 6 June 1985. His son, Rudy Soedjarwo, is a film director.

Life timeline
 1952 - graduated from high school in Magelang
 1954 - graduated from police academy in Sukabumi
 1954–1956 - Police Chief Inspector in Palopo
 1956 - aide Chief of Police Sukanto Tjokrodiatmodjo
 1956–1957 - Head of Traffic at Makassar
 1957–1958 - attache Foreign Relations Section of the Bureau of Police Headquarters Organizations
 1959–1961 - Force Commander on Mobile Brigade
 1960 - ranger training in Porong
 1961 - infantry training in the United States
 1962–1964 - Battalion Commander 1232/Pelopor on Mobile Brigade
 1962 - led the unit that went into New Guinea
 1964–1972 - Commander, Pioneer Regiment, Brimob
 1967 - Furthered his studies at the Staff College in Lembang
 1969 - Graduated as a paratrooper in Sukasari
 1969–1972 - Tanjung Priok district police  chief
 1972–1974 - Commander, Kores 102, Kodak 10 in Malang
 1974 - Commander, Komapta
 1974–1977 - Commander, Regional Command Police (Kodak) 11 (West Kalimantan)
 1977–1979 - Commander, Kodak 2 (North Sumatra)
 1979–1982 - Brigadier General (Pol.), then Major General (Pol.), Kodak 7 (Jakarta Raya)
 1982–1985 - Chief of Police

External links
 [ Current Data on the Indonesian Military Elite], accessed 14 November 2005
 

1930 births
1988 deaths
Chiefs of police
Indonesian police officers
People from Bandung
Javanese people